Majid Aliyari (born 2 March 1996) is an Iranian footballer who plays as a forward who currently plays for Iranian club Foolad in the Persian Gulf Pro League.

Club career

Saba Qom
He made his debut for Saba Qom in 13th fixtures of 2016–17 Iran Pro League against Sepahan while he substituted in for Karim Eslami.

References

1996 births
Living people
Iranian footballers
Saba players
Pars Jonoubi Jam players
Association football midfielders